Vjekoslav Katusin (born October 28, 1983) is a Croatian director, producer and actor, born in the German city Mainz.

Early life

In the age of one, he moved to his parents homeland Croatia with his mother and older brother. Until he was five he lived in Draz, where he attended first grade in elementary school. After the first year of school he returned to Mainz with his mother and brother to visit his father. After the outbreak of war between Serbia and Croatia, his family was not allowed to return to Croatia.

Career

From 2006 Vjekoslav Katusin appeared as a minor actor in various movies, including Superheroes - Hasenbrot and Waldgeflüster (2007) and - after meeting the german producer Uwe Boll - in his films Max Schmeling (2010), in which he was also responsible for the Croatian cast, Bloodrayne: The Third Reich and Blubberella.

In 2015, he produced Dead End - At the end we die, a Croatian crime series for the first time, which was realized in English in order to appeal to an international audience with the series. The pilot episode premiered at the Harmony Gold Theater in Los Angeles.

In 2016 Katusin founded his own production company Dream Team Pictures based in Rust, Baden-Württemberg/Germany. In 2017, he shot his first horror film C.L.E.A.N. in Pula, Croatia, in which Hollywood actors Tom Sizemore and 
Costas Mandylor played. On October 18, 2020, the film was presented at the 14th Festival of Serbian Fantastic Film (FSFF) in Belgrade. C.L.E.A.N. has received several awards from various film festivals, including two Osculls in the categories "Best Horror Film" & "Best Supporting Actor". The Austrian cinema chain Cineplexx showed the film from the end of October 2020 for several weeks in their cinemas in Serbia, Montenegro and Bosnia.

In early 2020, he finished shooting his second horror film Unbound Evil, again with Costas Mandylor. In 2022, he will finish his film project Someone Dies Tonight in which Eric Roberts, Christopher Lambert, Tom Sizemore, Michael Paré, Bai Ling, Robert Miano & Costas Mandylor will take on supporting roles.

Filmography (selection) 
As Actor
 2007: Stuntmen – Der Film
 2007: Blood Wars
 2007: Superhelden – Hasenbrot und Waldgeflüster
 2007: Live Fast and Die Young
 2008: Der letzte Coup
 2010: Max Schmeling (film)
 2010: Bloodrayne: The Third Reich
 2011: Blubberella
 2016: Dead End. At the End We Die
 2018: La Famiglia
 2019: C.L.E.A.N.
 2022: Unbound Evil

As Producer
 2008: Der letzte Coup
 2016: Dead End. At the End We Die
 2018: La Famiglia
 2019: C.L.E.A.N.

Reception 
On October 18, 2020, his movie C.L.E.A.N. was presented at the 14th Festival of Serbian Fantastic Film (FSFF) in Belgrade. Subsequently, the producer received several awards from various international film festivals.

References 

Croatian film producers
Croatian male film actors
Croatian film directors
1983 births
Living people